Kumaran may refer to:

Kumaran (surname)
Kumaran, Bangladesh, place in Dhaka Division, Bangladesh
Kumaran Kundram, hillrock located at Chromepet, Chennai, Tamil Nadu, Indian
College Kumaran, 2008 Malayalam film directed by Thulasidas, starring Mohanlal and Vimala Raman
Sainikudu, dubbed in Tamil as Kumaran, 2006 Telugu film

See also
Sri Kumaran Children's Home, Bangalore
Kumara (disambiguation)